Oboronia ornata, the untailed ginger white, is a butterfly in the family Lycaenidae. It is found in Guinea, Sierra Leone, Liberia, Ivory Coast, Ghana, Togo, Nigeria, Cameroon, Equatorial Guinea, Gabon, the Republic of the Congo, the Democratic Republic of the Congo, Uganda and Tanzania. The habitat consists of forests and Guinea savanna in riparian vegetation.

Both sexes are attracted to a small orange-flowered asteraceous plant without petals.

The larvae feed on Costus fissiligulatus and C. dubius.

Subspecies
 Oboronia ornata ornata (Guinea, Sierra Leone, Liberia, Ivory Coast, Ghana, Togo, Nigeria: south and the Cross River loop, western Cameroon)
 Oboronia ornata flava Holland, 1920 (Equatorial Guinea)
 Oboronia ornata vestalis (Aurivillius, 1895) (Cameroon, Gabon, Congo, Democratic Republic of the Congo, Uganda, western Tanzania)

References

Butterflies described in 1890
Polyommatini
Butterflies of Africa